This is a list of "Operating Banking Institutions" in Zimbabwe.

 Agricultural Development Bank of Zimbabwe
  BancABC Zimbabwe
 CABS
 CBZ Bank Limited 
 First Capital Bank Limited
 Ecobank Zimbabwe Limited
 FBC Bank Limited 
 Nedbank Zimbabwe Limited 
 Metbank
 NMB Bank Limited
 Stanbic Bank Zimbabwe Limited
 Standard Chartered Bank Zimbabwe Limited
 Steward Bank
 ZB Bank Limited
 Tetrad Investment Bank Limited
 FBC Building Society
 National Building Society
 ZB Building Society
 People's Own Savings Bank
 Infrastructure Development Bank of Zimbabwe
 Small and Medium Enterprises Development Corporation.
 Time Bank

See also
Economy of Zimbabwe
List of banks in Africa
Reserve Bank of Zimbabwe

References

External links
Zimbabwe Banking Banking Sector Profits Double
Website of Reserve Bank of Zimbabwe

 
Banks
Zimbabwe
Zimbabwe